Unknown Soldier is an album by Nigerian Afrobeat composer, bandleader and multi-instrumentalist Fela Kuti, recorded in 1979 and originally released on the Nigerian Skylark label.

Reception

AllMusic stated: "An epic 31-minute tribute to his fallen mother, Unknown Soldier is one of the most ambitious recordings of Kuti's career which describes in frightening detail the events that transpired on the eve of the Kalakuta raid.... Kuti gives a tortured, powerful performance of some of his most vivid and incendiary music – music that was in many ways the ideological equal of the physical torture that Kuti and his company had endured".

Track listing
All compositions composed and arranged by Fela Kuti. French lyrics translated by Kwesi Yopee
 "Unknown Soldier" (Instrumental) – 14:45  
 "Unknown Soldier" (Vocal) – 16:23

Personnel
Fela Kuti – tenor saxophone, alto saxophone, electric piano, vocals
Nana Kwame Opoku, Okalue Ojeah – tenor guitar
Mardo Martino, Tunde Brown – rhythm guitar
Adekunle Adewala, Kalenky Clement Djalo – bass guitar
Durotimi Ikujenyo – rhythm piano
Oyinade Adeniran, Yinusa Akinibosun – tenor saxophone
Lekan Animashaun – baritone saxophone, leader, soloist
Mukoro Owieh – second baritone saxophone
Oye Shobowale – trumpet
Tony Allen – drums kit
Nicholas Avom, Maseaswe Anam – drums
Popoola Awodoye, Okon Etuk Iyang, Moses Emmanuel – congas
Taiye Ojomo – claves
Fesobi Olawaiye – maracas
Alake Anikulapo Kuti, Fehintola Anikulapo Kuti, Folake Anikulapo Kuti, Ihase Anikulapo Kuti, Kevwe Anikulapo Kuti, Omowunmi Anikulapo Kuti, Tejumade Anikulapo Kuti, Tokunbo Anikulapo Kuti – Africa 70 singers
Technical
Tunde Orimogunje – design
Femi Osunla – photography

References

Fela Kuti albums
1981 albums
Afrobeat albums